Three ships of the Turkish Navy have borne the name Demirhisar':

  was a torpedo boat launched in 1907 for service with the Ottoman Navy. Beached in 1915 and subsequently destroyed.
  was a  launched in 1941 and stricken in 1960.
She was transferred to Turkey in 1964.

Turkish Navy ship names